Hacker is a surname. Notable people with the name include:

 Alan Hacker (1938–2012), English clarinettist
 Alf Hacker (1912–1970), Australian rules footballer 
 Andrew Hacker (born 1929), American political scientist
 Arthur Hacker (1858–1919), British artist
 Benjamin Thurman Hacker (1935–2003), U.S. Naval officer
 Dan Hacker (born 1982), American ice hockey center 
 David Hacker (born 1964), British field hockey player
 Eric Hacker (born 1983), American baseball pitcher 
 Francis Hacker (died 1660), fought for Parliament during the English Civil War
 George Hacker, American lawyer and alcohol advocate
 George Hacker (bishop) (born 1928), Suffragan Bishop of Penrith
 Hans Hacker (1910–1994), ceramic decal designer and painter
 Hilary Baumann Hacker (1913–1990), American Roman Catholic bishop
 Jack Hacker (1914–1984), Australian rules footballer
 Jacob Hacker (born 1971), American political scientist
 Jeremiah Hacker (1801–1895), American reformer and journalist
 Johnathan Hacker, American engineer
 Jörg Hacker (born 1952), German microbiologist
 Katharina Hacker (born 1967), German author
 Katrina Hacker (born 1990), American figure skater
 Marcel Hacker (born 1977), German rower
 Marilyn Hacker (born 1942), American poet, critic, and reviewer
 Paul Hacker (Indologist) (1913–1979), Indologist from Germany
 Paul Hacker (diplomat) (born 1946), American diplomat
 Peter Hacker (born 1939), British philosopher
 Peter Hacker (cricketer) (born 1952), English cricketer
 Rich Hacker (born 1947), American baseball player, base coach and scout
 Rose Hacker (1906–2008), British socialist, writer, sex educator and campaigner for social justice
 Sally Hacker (1936–1988), American feminist sociologist
 Severin Hacker (born 1984), Swiss computer scientist, co-founder and CTO of Duolingo
 Stamford Hacker (1876–1925), English cricketer
 Thomas Hacker (born 1967), German politician
 Warren Hacker (1924–2002), American baseball pitcher

See also
 Häcker (surname)